Adamowo-Zastawa  is a village in the administrative district of Gmina Mielnik, within Siemiatycze County, Podlaskie Voivodeship, in north-eastern Poland, close to the border with Belarus. Through the village runs Voivodeship road 640 as well as Druzhba pipeline.

The village has a population of 160.

References

Adamowo-Zastawa